Roll Out is an American sitcom that aired Friday evenings on CBS during the 1973-1974 television season. Starring nightclub comedian Stu Gilliam and Hilly Hicks, and featuring Ed Begley Jr. and Garrett Morris, the series was set in France during World War II and was loosely based on the 1952 film Red Ball Express.

Actor Jimmy Lydon, familiar as a juvenile lead in the 1940s, was cast as an Army captain. His character's name was Henry Aldrich; the same name he used in Paramount's comedy features of the 1940s.

Synopsis
In an effort to cash in on the success of M*A*S*H, CBS decided to air another Army comedy. Instead of Army medics, Roll Out highlighted the pratfalls of the supply drivers of the fictional 5050th Quartermaster Truck Company of the U.S. Third Army's Red Ball Express, whose staff was mainly African American. The series attempted to use the World War II setting as a commentary on race relations, just as M*A*S*H's Korean War setting was also a commentary on the Vietnam War.

Roll Out aired opposite ABC's The Odd Couple. Subsequently, Roll Out failed to win its timeslot and was canceled halfway through its sole season. It was replaced on February 8, 1974, by Good Times, a spin-off of Maude starring Esther Rolle and John Amos, which would run for six seasons.

Cast

Episodes

External links

 

1973 American television series debuts
1974 American television series endings
1970s American sitcoms
1970s American black sitcoms
CBS original programming
English-language television shows
Military comedy television series
Live action television shows based on films
Television series by 20th Century Fox Television
World War II television comedy series
Television shows set in Paris